
Marci may refer to:
 3791 Marci, a main belt asteroid named after Jan Marek Marci
 Marci (crater), a lunar crater named after Jan Marek Marci
 Mars Color Imager (MARCI), camera built for Mars Reconnaissance Orbiter
 Marci Beaucoup, a studio album by American hip hop artist Roc Marciano

Biology 
 Odetta marci, a species of sea snail
 Felimare marci, a species of sea slug
 Bibio marci, a fly from the family Bibionidae
 Neptis marci, a butterfly in the family Nymphalidae
 Aphnaeus marci, a butterfly in the family Lycaenidae
 Cephetola marci, a butterfly in the family Lycaenidae

Movies 
 Marci X, a 2003 American romcom movie
 Marci és a kapitány, a Hungarian series of puppet films from 1977

People  
 Carl Marci (born 1969), an American neuroscientist
 Jan Marek Marci (1595–1667), a Czech doctor and scientist
 Marci Alboher an American author and journalist from New York
 Marci Bowers (born 1958), an American gynecologist 
 Marci Francisco (born 1950) a U.S. Democratic member of the Kansas Senate
 Marci Geller, an American singer-songwriter
 Marci Gonzalez (born 1982) a reporter for ABC News
 Marci Hamilton (born 1957) head of an American think tank to prevent child abuse and neglect
 Marci Harris, CEO and co-founder of PopVox
 Marci Ien (born 1969) a Canadian broadcast journalist
 Marci Jobson (born 1975) an American soccer player
 Marci Klein (born 1967), an American television producer 
 Marci Liroff (born 1958) an American casting director
 Marci McDonald a Canadian journalist and author
 Marci Miller (born 1989), an American model, singer and actress
 Marci Segal an American psychologist
 Marci Shore, an American associate professor of intellectual history at Yale University
 Marci Zaroff an American green business leader

See also
 Dave Marcis
 Mārcis Auziņš
 Marcis Auto Racing
 Marcis Dzelzainis
 Mārcis Ošs